Frank Pierce Milburn (December 12, 1868 - September 21, 1926) was a prolific American architect of the late 19th and early 20th centuries. His practice was primarily focused on public buildings, particularly courthouses and legislative buildings, although he also designed railroad stations, commercial buildings, schools  and residences. Milburn was a native of Bowling Green, Kentucky who practiced as an architect in  Louisville from 1884 to 1889; Kenova, West Virginia 1890-1895; Charlotte, North Carolina; Columbia, South Carolina; and Washington, D.C. after 1904. From 1902 Milburn was architect for the Southern Railway.

Milburn pioneered a new approach to the marketing of architectural services, publishing sponsored books of his work, placing advertisements in trade publications, entering competitions and moving his office to suit available opportunities. This resulted in work in every Southern state.

Milburn was particularly successful in obtaining commissions for significant public buildings, ranging from county courthouses to state capitols. Milburn did significant work at the South Carolina State House and the old Florida State Capitol, and unsuccessfully competed for work on the Arkansas Capitol.

In 1902, Milburn did design upgrade for the Florida State Capitol and designed  Columbia County Courthouse in Lake City, Florida.  That same year he also designed the Blanche Hotel across the street from the courthouse.

South Carolina State House
Milburn won a 1900 competition to complete the South Carolina State House over William Augustus Edwards and Charles Coker Wilson, as well as Gadsen E. Shand, an assistant to former State House architect Frank Niernsee.

Milburn's selection was made easier by the fact that the proposed cost for his design was the least expensive of those submitted. Plans and specifications were issued and bids accepted, but a dispute broke out immediately over differences between the competition design and that issued for bidding. Milburn had reduced the number of columns on the north portico by six and had removed a line of columns on the south portico to remain within the appropriated budget. Other changes to the dome and disputes over the quantity and accuracy of details and the quality of the work caused legal and  political difficulties, but the project proceeded. Milburn, however, moved to Washington when his work with the Southern Railway offered the opportunity.

In Washington
Once in Washington, Milburn teamed with Michael Heister (1909 - 1934) to form the firm of Milburn and Heister. Milburn's son, Thomas Y. Milburn, joined the firm in 1914 and took over the firm a year before his father's death in  1926.

Work
W. Hunt Harris house at 425 Caroline Street in Key West, Florida

Gallery

See also
 List of buildings by Frank Pierce Milburn, includes buildings by Milburn and Heister until Milburn's retirement in 1925

References

External links
 1901 self-published promotional book by Milburn with illustrations at the Internet Archive

19th-century American architects
1868 births
1926 deaths
People from Bowling Green, Kentucky
Architects from Kentucky
American railway architects
20th-century American architects
Southern Railway (U.S.)